The Mitchinamecus River is a watercourse of the North Shore of St. Lawrence River, in the province of Quebec, in Canada. The current of this river crosses the territory of:
the city of La Tuque, in Mauricie;
the unorganized territories of Baie-Obaoca, in Matawinie Regional County Municipality, in Lanaudière administrative region;
the unorganized territories of Lac-Oscar, in Antoine-Labelle Regional County Municipality), in the administrative region of Laurentides.

Geography 
The Mitchinamecus River originates at the southern limit of the township of Dandurand and south of the municipality of Parent, in Haut-Saint-Maurice, in Mauricie. Head Lake (altitude: , U-shaped) constitutes the head lake of the Mitchinamecus River.

The main watersheds around the head of the Mitchinamecus River are;
 in the North: Lac Dandurand which is a tributary of the Bazin River;
 to the east: Pierre River, Cabasta River, Némiscachingue River; Adam River;
 to the south: Rivière du Lièvre;
 to the west: Bazin River.

River course downstream from Height Lake (23.8 km segment)

From the mouth west of Height Lake, the Mitchinamecus River flows over:
  towards the northwest by collecting the waters of Lac du Portage (altitude: , coming from the north), up to the outlet of Lac Hull;
  westward, to the outlet of Head Lake, of Lac Aigu and Lake Hare;
  south-west, up to the road bridge connecting the two shores in a strait of Long Lake. Note: Long Lake receives on its east shore the Pierre River;
  to the southwest, crossing Long Lake over its full length.

Course of the river downstream from Lac Long (78.3 km segment)

From the dam located at the mouth southwest of the long lake, the Mitchinamecus river flows over:
  towards the south-west, crossing several lakes which constitute an enlargement of the river, up to the outlet of Slow Lake and Peabody, coming from the south-east;
  south-west to the outlet of Basset lakes, Fleet and Georges, coming from the north;
  south-west to the outlet of Lac Tournière, coming from the south;
  south-west to the outlet of Lac Mignarde, coming from the north;
  ( in a direct line) south-west, forming numerous streamers, to the outlet of Leluau lake, coming from the east ;
  ( in a direct line) westward, forming numerous streamers, to the northeast shore of the north bay of Mitchinamecus reservoir;
  crossing to the southwest the north bay of the Mitchinamecus reservoir, to the Dépôt-Carrier bridge;
  towards the southwest crossing the Mitchinamecus reservoir, up to Mitchinamecus Dam.

River course downstream of the Mitchinamecus Reservoir (25.1 km segment)

From the dam at the mouth to the south of the Mitchinamecus reservoir, the river flows on:

  east to the outlet of Nottaway Creek;
  southwards, to the outlet of Lac de la Loutre;
  south-east, up to Rascas Falls;
  south, to Louise stream, coming from the east;
  southeasterly, up to Cannor stream, coming from the east;
  southwest, to Matts Creek;
  south-west, to the mouth of the Mitchinamecus river which flows into the Lièvre river which forms a large loop at this point. This confluence is designated "Les Fourches".

The lower segments of the Mitchinamecus River are navigated by canoeists in whitewater.

Toponymy 
The term Mitchinamecus refers to a zec, a river, a reservoir and a dam.

Formerly, the Mitchinamecus river was also designated:
 Otter river and Macamekosi Sipi. This toponym appears in the official documentation in 1911. Of Cree origin, this toponym means "large trout", of misinamecus, formed of mis, large, large and namecus, trout.
 Mashamengoose river, sometimes spelled Menjobabuse.

The toponym Rivière Mitchinamecus was formalized on September 12, 1986 at the Bank of Place Names of the Commission de toponymie du Québec.

Notes and references

See also 

 Mitchinamecus Reservoir, a body of water
 Rivière du Lièvre, a stream
 Pierre River, a stream
 Matawinie Regional County Municipality
 Baie-Obaoca, an unorganized territory
 List of rivers of Quebec

External links 

Tributaries of the Saint Lawrence River